George Tucker Stainback (August 4, 1911 – November 29, 1992) was an American professional baseball outfielder. He played in Major League Baseball (MLB) for 13 seasons with the Chicago Cubs (1934–1937), St. Louis Cardinals (1938), Philadelphia Phillies (1938), Brooklyn Dodgers (1938–1939), Detroit Tigers (1940–1941), New York Yankees (1942–1945), and Philadelphia Athletics (1946).

Playing career 
Born in Los Angeles, Stainback played in 817 games, 629 in the outfield. For his career, he had a .259 batting average with 17 home runs and 204 RBIs. An unusual statistic from his career was that his career errors (48) outnumbered his home runs and stolen bases combined (44).

Career highlights

 As a rookie outfielder with the Chicago Cubs in 1934, he batted .306.
 In the 1935 World Series, Stainback was on the bench for the Chicago Cubs when he began riding umpire George Moriarty, leading to the entire Cubs' dugout being cleared.  Stainback was ejected.  He did not make an appearance in the 1935 World Series.
 In April 1938, after four seasons with the Cubs, Stainback was traded to the St. Louis Cardinals in a deal for pitcher Dizzy Dean.
 On May 28, 1938, after being selected off waivers by the Philadelphia Phillies, Stainback single-handedly prevented Carl Hubbell from pitching a perfect game.  Stainback was the only Phillies baserunner, as he had both a walk and a single off Hubbell. 
 Traded to the Brooklyn Dodgers on July 30, 1940, Stainback hit .327 in 104 at bats for the Dodgers.
 Stainback played four seasons for the New York Yankees from 1942 to 1945.  He played in seven World Series games for the Yankees in 1942 and 1943, helping the Yankees to win the 1943 World Series.
 After retiring as a player, Stainback helped organize the first pension system for major league ballplayers in 1947.

Dodger executive career 
After the Dodgers moved to Los Angeles in 1958, Stainback, who had settled in the area after retiring from baseball, approached the Dodgers' Red Patterson with his idea to develop ticket sales to fraternal and civic organizations. He developed group ticket sales over a 20-year career as a Dodger executive and supervised the club's Knothole program, which treated children to free games.

Death 
Stainback died in 1992 after suffering a stroke in Camarillo, California, at age 81.

References

Sources

 New York Times Obituary
 Los Angeles Times Obituary
 

1911 births
1992 deaths
Baseball players from Los Angeles
Major League Baseball outfielders
Chicago Cubs players
St. Louis Cardinals players
Philadelphia Phillies players
Brooklyn Dodgers players
Detroit Tigers players
New York Yankees players
Philadelphia Athletics players
Bisbee Bees players
Los Angeles Angels (minor league) players
Montreal Royals players
Newark Bears (IL) players
Spokane Indians players
Fairfax High School (Los Angeles) alumni